Glenn Patterson (born 1961) is a writer from Belfast, best known as a novelist.

Biography
Patterson was born in Belfast where he attended Methodist College Belfast. He graduated from the University of East Anglia (BA, MA), where he was a product of the UEA creative writing course under Malcolm Bradbury. 

He is currently a Professor of Creative Writing in the School of Arts, English and Literature and Director of the Seamus Heaney Centre at Queen's University Belfast.

He has been a writer in residence at the University of East Anglia and the University College Cork, and was the Ireland Fund Artist-in-Residence in the Celtic Studies Department of St. Michael's College at the University of Toronto in October 2013. 

He lives in Belfast with his wife and two children.

Work
In addition to his novels, he also makes documentaries for the BBC and has published his collected journalistic writings as Lapsed Protestant (2006). He has written plays for Radio 3 and Radio 4, and co-wrote with Colin Carberry the screenplay of the 2013 film Good Vibrations, about the music scene in Belfast during the late 1970s (based on the true story of Terri Hooley)

Patterson's recurring theme is the reassessment of the past. In The International, he recovers that moment in Belfast's history just before the outbreak of the Troubles, to show diverse strands of city life around a city centre hotel, essentially to make the point that the political propagandists who explain their positions through history overlook its inconvenient complexity and the possibility that things might have turned out differently.

Bibliography

Novels
 Burning Your Own (London: Chatto and Windus, 1988)
 Fat Lad (London: Chatto and Windus, 1992)
 Black Night at Big Thunder Mountain (London: Chatto and Windus, 1995)
 The International (London: Anchor Books, 1999)
 Number 5 (London: Hamish Hamilton, 2003)
 That Which Was (London: Hamish Hamilton, 2004)
 The Third Party (Belfast: Blackstaff Press, 2007)
 The Mill for Grinding Old People Young (London: Faber, 2012)
 Gull (London: Head of Zeus, 2016)
 Where Are We Now? (London: Head of Zeus, 2020)

Non-fiction

 Lapsed Protestant (Dublin: New Island Books, 2006), journalistic writings
 Once Upon a Hill: Love in Troubled Times (London: Bloomsbury, 2008), memoir
 Backstop Land (London: Head of Zeus, 2019), journalistic writings

Awards
 2016 Heimbold Visiting Chair of Irish Studies
 2014 BAFTA nomination
 2008 Lanaan Literary Fellowship
 2007 Elected to Aosdana
 1988 Rooney Prize for Irish Literature 
 1988 Betty Trask Award

References

External links
 Claire Burgess, "An Interview with Glenn Patterson", Nashville Review, 1 August 2010.
 Glenn Patterson: "Baftas: My big night with the A-listers", Belfast Telegraph, 18 February 2014.

Male novelists from Northern Ireland
1961 births
Living people
Alumni of the University of East Anglia
Academics of the University of East Anglia
Aosdána members
Writers from Belfast
People educated at Methodist College Belfast
21st-century writers from Northern Ireland